Abby Andrews (born 28 November 2000) is an Australian female water polo Olympian. She was born in Brisbane, Queensland, Australia in 2000.

Early life 
Andrews went to Brisbane Girls Grammar and loved swimming. She competed at the 2018 Youth World Championships during her studies at University of Queensland. She then enrolled in the University of Michigan. She was named the 2019 Collegiate Water Polo Association (CWPA) Rookie of the Tournament and Rookie of the Year.

Achievements 
Andrews then competed at the 2019 World University Games in Naples, Italy where Australia came fifth.

Andrews was a member of the Australian Stingrays squad that competed at the Tokyo 2020 Olympics. The Head Coach was Predrag Mihailović. By finishing second in their pool, the Aussie Stingers went through to the quarterfinals. They were beaten 8-9 by Russia and therefore did not compete for an Olympic medal. Australia at the 2020 Summer Olympics details the team's performance in depth.

References

External links
 
 
 

2000 births
Living people
Australian female water polo players
Sportspeople from Brisbane
Water polo players at the 2020 Summer Olympics
Olympic water polo players of Australia
21st-century Australian women